Fumaria barnolae is a species of plant in the family Papaveraceae.

Sources

References 

barnolae
Flora of Malta